El Valle, Choco, is a beach town located in the Municipality of Bahía Solano, Department of Chocó, on Colombia's Pacific Coast, some 150 km West of Medellín, and roughly 100 km South of the border with Panama. There is one road connecting El Valle with the town of Bahía Solano, 18 km or 40 minutes down a half paved jungle road. There is no road access to the area from the rest of Colombia. To enter the area it is necessary to take a plane from Medellín or Quibdó or boat from Buenaventura or Panama. El Valle is a fishing village located at the mouth of the Rio Valle, forming a fertile breeding ground that results in abundant fishing and scuba diving opportunities.

Climate
El Valle has a very wet tropical rainforest climate (Af).

Populated places in the Chocó Department